Stefano Olubunmi Layeni (born 10 March 1982) is an Italian footballer of Nigerian descent who plays as a goalkeeper for Prato in the Prima Divisione league.

Career
Born in Castiglione delle Stiviere, Lombardy to Nigerian parents originary from Lagos, His middle name "Olubunmi" means "gift of God" in the Yoruba language Layeni started his career at Lombardy club Montichiari. In mid-2001, he was signed by Como, but as a third goalkeeper. He finally have a change to play for the club at 2003–04 season, as a backup goalkeeper for Fabrizio Ferron. In mid-2004, he joined Prato, which he was the first choice goalkeeper ahead Americo Gambardella. In mid-2006 the club signed Renato Piovezan and Layeni was loaned out on the whole season. In mid-2008, Davide Grilli was signed as Piovezan replacement, Layeni shared the first choice role with him.

In mid-2009, he was signed by AlbinoLeffe, which all four goalkeeper of the last season were left the club. Layeni played his first match for the club at Coppa Italia, a 1–3 loss to SPAL. He would fight for a startup place against Daniel Offredi, Paolo Branduani and Ivan Pelizzoli. Eventually he was the starting keeper until November lost his place to Pelizzoli.

His loan was extended in 2010–11 season, he also changed his shirt number from 82 to 28. Since Pelizzoli's loan was not extended, Branduani and Offredi left on loan, Layeni started the opening match of the season, ahead new signing Luca Tomasig, despite he wore no.1 shirt. AlbinoLeffe won fellow Serie B club Pescara 3–1 in the Coppa Italia match. In July 2011 return oh his club Prato.

Honours
Como
 Serie B: 2001–02

References

External links
 
 

1982 births
Living people
People from Castiglione delle Stiviere
Italian footballers
Como 1907 players
A.C. Prato players
Venezia F.C. players
U.C. AlbinoLeffe players
Association football goalkeepers
A.C. Montichiari players
Stefano Layeni
Italian people of Nigerian descent
Italian people of Yoruba descent
Italian sportspeople of African descent
Yoruba sportspeople
Sportspeople from the Province of Mantua
Footballers from Lombardy